Anne Barbara Underhill FRSC (June 12, 1920 - July 3, 2003) was a Canadian astrophysicist. She is most widely known for her work on early-type stars and was considered one of the world's leading experts in the field. During her lifetime she received many awards for her contributions to astronomy and astrophysics.

Early life 
Underhill grew up in Vancouver, British Columbia. She was the only girl of five children born to European immigrants Irene Anna (née Creery) and civil engineer Frederic Clare Underhill. She was awarded the Lieutenant Governor's medal in high school for her outstanding school performance. She was close with her twin brother and three younger brothers, and helped to raise them following the death of her mother when she was 18. In 1944 her twin brother was killed in World War II.

Education 
Underhill graduated from the University of British Columbia in 1942 with a BA Hons in chemistry. She continued her education at the University and received a master's degree in physics and mathematics in 1944. After graduating with her MA she received a substantial scholarship from the Canadian Federation of University Women which enabled her to enroll at the University of Toronto, however she left after a year because the University's astrophysics program was considered weak at that time. She went on to receive her Ph.D. from the University of Chicago in 1948 under the supervision of famous astrophysicist Subrahmanyan Chandrasekhar. Her thesis topic was multi-layered stellar atmospheres and contained the first model for this phenomenon.

Career
From 1948 to 1949 she held an NRC Postdoctoral Fellowship at Copenhagen Observatory. In 1949, Underhill accepted a position as a research scientist at the Dominion Astrophysical Observatory (DAO), in Victoria, where she worked until 1962. During this time she was a visiting professor at both Harvard and Princeton universities. While at Princeton she used their computing facilities to write software to model stellar atmospheres. At the DAO she encountered sexism from her male PhD colleagues who limited her responsibilities while giving more to less qualified male coworkers.

In 1962 she unexpectedly received a letter of offer from the Utrecht University in the Netherlands for the position of full professor in astrophysics. She was reluctant to leave Canada so the decision to take the job was not an easy one despite the mistreatment she had experienced by her colleagues. At the Utrecht University she lectured at the graduate level and published The Early Type Stars. In 1970, she received a job offer arrived from NASA's Goddard Space Flight Center where she worked until her retirement 15 years later.

Publications
Including:
 1948: Some Aspects of B-Type Spectra, PhD dissertation University of Chicago
 1959 with John H Waddell: Stark broadening functions for the hydrogen lines, [Washington] U.S. Dept. of Commerce, National Bureau of Standards, 1959, National Bureau of Standards circular, 603 
 1966: The Early Type Stars, Dordrecht, Holland, D. Reidel. New York, Gordon and Breach, 1966
 1982 with Vera Doazan: B stars with and without emission lines, Monograph series on nonthermal phenomena in stellar atmospheres, NASA SP (Series) 456. ntrs.nasa.gov Full-text PDF
 1985 with A. G. Michalitsianos: The Origin of Nonradiative Heating/Momentum in Hot Stars, NASA Scientific and Technical Information Branch, 1985
 1988 with P. S. Conti: O stars and Wolf-Rayet stars, Paris, France: CNRS; Washington, D.C. : National Aeronautics and Space Administration, Scientific and Technical Information Branch; [Springfield, Va.], Monograph series on nonthermal phenomena in stellar atmospheres; NASA SP (Series) 497.

Dutch PhD students at Utrecht University
At Utrecht University Underhill supervised the following PhD junior researchers as promotor (doctoral advisor) or as copromotor (secondary doctoral advisor).

External links
 academic.oup.com Allan J. Willis: Obituaries: Anne Barbara Underhill 1920–2003 pdf. Astronomy & Geophysics, Volume 44, Issue 6, December 2003, page 6.35. Consulted on 20 January 2021.

References

1920 births
2003 deaths
Canadian astrophysicists
Women astrophysicists
Fellows of the Royal Society of Canada
University of Chicago alumni
University of British Columbia Faculty of Science alumni
People from Vancouver
20th-century Canadian astronomers
Academic staff of Utrecht University
Canadian expatriates in the United States
Canadian expatriates in the Netherlands